Hibbertia malleolacea is a species of flowering plant in the family Dilleniaceae and is endemic to the northern parts of the Northern Territory. It is a straggly shrub with hairy foliage, elliptic leaves, and yellow flowers arranged in leaf axils with 28 to 32 stamens arranged in bundles around three carpels.

Description
Flowering occurs from December to June.

Taxonomy
Hibbertia malleolacea was first formally described in 2010 by Hellmut R. Toelken in the Journal of the Adelaide Botanic Gardens from specimens collected near Jabiru in 1980. The specific epithet (malleolacea) means "like a mallet", referring to the shape of the peduncle.

Distribution and habitat
This hibbertia grows in sandstone crevices in heath on the Arnhem Land Plateau.

Conservation status
Hibbertia malleolacea is classified as of "least concern" under the Territory Parks and Wildlife Conservation Act 1976.

See also
List of Hibbertia species

References

malleolacea
Flora of the Northern Territory
Plants described in 2010
Taxa named by Hellmut R. Toelken